Matúš Viedenský (born February 12, 1992) is a Slovak ice hockey player. Viedenský made his Slovak Extraliga debut playing with MsHK Zilina during the 2010–11 Slovak Extraliga season.

References

External links

1992 births
Living people
MsHK Žilina players
Slovak ice hockey left wingers
Ice hockey people from Bratislava